A nun is a member of a religious community of women.

Nun, Nuns or NUN may also refer to:

 Nun (band), an Australian music group
 Nun (biblical figure)
 Nun (letter), in many Semitic alphabets
 Nun languages, a group of Eastern Grassfields languages
 Nun pigeon
 Nun River, Nigeria
 Nun, another term for the Egyptian god Nu
 Nun, a mountain of the Nun Kun massif in Kashmir, India
 Nun, the fish Oxynoemacheilus galilaeus
 NUN, IATA code for Saufley Field airport, Pensacola, Florida, U.S.
 NUN, National Rail station code for Nuneaton railway station, UK 
 , a Latin abbreviation for the nundinae market days

See also
 The Nun (disambiguation)
 Nunn (disambiguation)